Başarı is a village in the Beşiri District, Batman Province, Turkey. Its population is 28 (2021).

References

Villages in Beşiri District